The 2021 United States mixed doubles curling Olympic trials were held from October 26 to 31, 2021, at Curl Mesabi in Eveleth, Minnesota. The trials featured ten teams played in a round robin tournament. After the round robin, the top four teams qualified for the page playoff. The winner of this event will represent the United States at the Olympic Qualification Event in hopes of reaching the 2022 Winter Olympics in Beijing, China.

Impact of the COVID-19 pandemic
The 2021 Trials were originally announced to be held in Irvine, California, but less than a month before they were to begin, the decision was made to move them to Eveleth, Minnesota due to the ongoing COVID-19 pandemic.

Qualification
The following teams qualified to participate in the 2021 mixed doubles trials:

Teams
The teams competing in the 2021 trials are:

Round-robin standings
Final round-robin standings

Round-robin results
All draw times are listed in Central Daylight Time (UTC−05:00).

Draw 1
Tuesday, October 26, 12:00 pm

Draw 2
Tuesday, October 26, 7:00 pm

Draw 3
Wednesday, October 27, 10:00 am

Draw 4
Wednesday, October 27, 2:30 pm

Draw 5
Wednesday, October 27, 7:00 pm

Draw 6
Thursday, October 28, 12:00 pm

Draw 7
Thursday, October 28, 7:00 pm

Draw 8
Friday, October 29, 12:00 pm

Draw 9
Friday, October 29, 6:00 pm

Tiebreakers
Saturday, October 30, 8:00 am

Playoffs

1 vs. 2
Saturday, October 30, 2:30 pm

3 vs. 4
Saturday, October 30, 12:00 pm

Semifinal
Sunday, October 31, 11:00 am

Final
Sunday, October 31, 7:00 pm

References

United States mixed doubles curling Olympic trials
United States Olympic Curling Trials
Curling at the 2022 Winter Olympics
Curling in Minnesota
United States mixed doubles curling Olympic trials
United States mixed doubles curling Olympic trials
United States mixed doubles curling Olympic trials
Mixed doubles curling